Shilovo is a rural locality (a village) in Kultayevskoye Rural Settlement, Permsky District, Perm Krai, Russia. The population was 61 as of 2010. There are 18 streets.

Geography 
Shilovo is located 27 km southwest of Perm (the district's administrative centre) by road. Petrovka is the nearest rural locality.

References 

Rural localities in Permsky District